Andrey Vladimirovich Menshikov (born 30 June 1977, in Moscow), mostly known under his stage name Ligalize (Russian: Лигалайз),  is a Russian hip hop artist and a former leader of the Legal Busine$$ band. Ligalize was also a member of D.O.B. and Bad Balance.

Menshikov was born July 30, 1977, in Moscow. Hip-hop came in 1993: Legalize and Ladjack organized the project "Slingshot". He called himself "Legalize" because that was the name of his first group. Slingshot was a more serious project. They began by rapping in English, as the Russian language did not seem appropriate for rap, and recorded their first underground album.

D.O.B.

Slingshot was the main part of the "Department Of Bastards" (D.O.B.). The founder of this group is Sir-J, whose background included the experience of living in neighborhoods of the Bronx. Legalize participated in D.O.B.'s recording "Rushun Roolet", an English-language rap with a hard underground sound.

In Moscow Legalize completed work on the album "Мастера Слова" ("Masters of Words"). For this album, Legalize rapped in Russian.

Legal Busine$$

Project "Legal Busine$$" (Легальный Бизне$$) with N'Pans seemed more attractive than just a solo MC Legalize. In general terms, the project looked like this: a talented Russian MC (Legalize), colorful black MC (N'Pans) and capable DJ (DJ Ton1k). In 2000 was released album of Legal Busine$$ - "Rifmomafiya".

P-13

In 2001 Legalize left Moscow and in Prague he crossed with a young rappers from the command P-13 (П-13). They record an album "Провокация" ("Provocation"), considered as one of the first albums of battle rap in Russia. Prague period lasted just over a year, and yet the Legalize is back.

Dissin' SheFF

In autumn 2002 Legalize returned to Moscow and took over the leadership of hip-hop project label D & D Music, a new company of Tolmatskogy.

XL

Despite the fact that the Liga of hip-hop for over ten years, he still had in an asset or as a solo album. In 2006, the solo album finally saw the light. The album is called "XL".

Discography
Slingshot
Salut Frum Rusha (Unreleased) (1994)
D.O.B.
Rushun Roolet (1997)
Мастера Слова (Masters Of Words) (2000)
Короли Андеграунда (Kings Of Underground) (2004)
Legal Busine$$
Рифмомафия (Rifmomafia) (2000)
Bad B.
Каменный Лес (Stone Forest) (2000)
Новый Мир (The New World) (2001)
Ligalize & P-13
Провокация (Provocation) (2003)
Solo
XL (2006)
Живой (Alive) (2016)
Молодой Король (Young King) (2018)
ALI (2020)

Mixtapes
Liga'MIX (2009)
Провокация Mixtape (Памяти МС Молодого) (Provocation Mixtape - R.I.P. MC Molodoy)' (2009)

External links
 
MTV.ru profile 

1977 births
Living people
Rappers from Moscow
Russian hip hop
Russian hip hop musicians